Sempre Livre ("always free") was a Brazilian pop rock band formed in Rio de Janeiro, only by women. The name of the group mentioned a famous brand of a sanitary pad. In 1984, they recorded their first disk, produced by Ruban, the same of the group As Frenéticas. The greatest hit was the song Eu sou free ("I'm free"), composed by Ruban and Patrícia Travassos. The band was over in 1986, but returned five years later with the disk Vícios da Cidade ("city vices"), but only the percussionist stayed from the original formation

Members 
 Dulce Quental - changed by Tonia Schubert and after by Denise Mastrangelo - voice
 Márcia - changed by Rosana Piegaia and after by Louise Rabello - guitar
 Flávia Cavaca - bass
 Lelete - changed by Sonia Bonfá and after by Cleo Boechat - organ
 Lúcia Lopes - percussion

Discography 
1984 - Avião de Combate
1991 - Vícios de Cidade

See also 
 Música popular brasileira

References 

Brazilian rock music groups
Musical groups established in 1984
All-female bands
Musical groups disestablished in 1986
Musical groups reestablished in 1991
1984 establishments in Brazil
1986 disestablishments in Brazil
1991 establishments in Brazil